Heman Allen Moore (August 27, 1809 – April 3, 1844) was an American lawyer and politician who served as a U.S. Representative from Ohio. He was elected to one-term in 1842, serving 13 months in office before his death.

Biography 
Born in Plainfield, Washington County, Vermont, Moore pursued an academic course.
He studied law in Rochester, New York.
He was admitted to the bar and commenced practice in Columbus, Ohio.

Congress 
Moore was elected as a Democrat to the Twenty-eighth Congress and served from March 4, 1843, until his death in Columbus, Ohio, April 3, 1844. Alfred P. Stone was elected to fill out his term.
He was interred in Green Lawn Cemetery.

See also
Politics of Ohio
List of United States Congress members who died in office (1790–1899)

References
 

1809 births
1844 deaths
People from Plainfield, Vermont
Politicians from Columbus, Ohio
Ohio lawyers
Burials at Green Lawn Cemetery (Columbus, Ohio)
19th-century American politicians
19th-century American lawyers
Democratic Party members of the United States House of Representatives from Ohio